Chaldon Hill, also called Chaldon Down, is one of the highest hills, on South Dorset's Jurassic Coast in England.

A bridleway crosses the hill just below the summit, whilst the South West Coast Path makes its way down the steep hillside to the beach heading for Durdle Door. At the summit is a tumulus and trig point. The hill is flanked by two coastal headlands: White Nothe and Bat's Head.

History 
There is abundant evidence of prehistoric settlement in the area: tumuli to the south-west and east, a field system and earthwork to the north-east and two named barrows to the east: Wardstone and Bush Barrows. There is evidence of another field system on the steep coastal hillside.

References 

Hills of Dorset